Graham Knight may refer to:

 Graham Knight (footballer, born 1952), English former professional footballer
 Graham Knight (broadcaster) (1949–2009), British broadcaster, journalist and author
 Graham Knight (Australian footballer) (born 1931), Australian rules football player for Fitzroy